The 2017 FIBA U16 Women's European Championship was the 29th edition of the Women's European basketball championship for national under-16 teams. It was played from 4 to 12 August 2017 in Bourges, France.

France won their 3rd championship title by beating Hungary in the final, 63–55.

Venues

Participating teams

 (Host)

 
  (3rd place, 2016 FIBA U16 Women's European Championship Division B)
  (Winners, 2016 FIBA U16 Women's European Championship Division B)
  (Runners-up, 2016 FIBA U16 Women's European Championship Division B)

First round
The first-round groups draw took place on 10 December 2016 in Prague, Czech Republic.

Group A

Group B

Group C

Group D

Knockout stage

Bracket

5th–8th place bracket

9th–16th place bracket

13th–16th place bracket

Final standings

References

External links
FIBA official website

2017
2017–18 in European women's basketball
2017–18 in French basketball
International youth basketball competitions hosted by France
International women's basketball competitions hosted by France
2017 in youth sport
August 2017 sports events in Europe